National Highway 2 — NH2, or National Road No.2 (10002), is one of the national highways of Cambodia. 

NH2 leads south out of Phnom Penh, through Kandal Province, and enters the Tram Kak District of Takéo Province. It continues south through Kiri Vong District in the province, where it veers due east and meets the border with Vietnam.

Images

References

Roads in Cambodia
Transport in Phnom Penh
Buildings and structures in Kandal province
Buildings and structures in Takéo province